General elections were held in the Netherlands on 11 June 1909. The Anti-Revolutionary Party and the General League of Roman Catholic Caucuses emerged as the largest parties, each winning 25 of the 100 seats in the House of Representatives.

Results

References

General elections in the Netherlands
Netherlands
1909 in the Netherlands
June 1909 events
Election and referendum articles with incomplete results
1909 elections in the Netherlands